House of Miracles is the second and final studio album by American new wave band the Vels, released in 1986 by Mercury Records and it was performed as a duo of Alice Cohen and Charles Hansen following the departure of founding member Chris Larkin. It was recorded at Studio Miraval in Correns, France with producer Steve Levine, best known for his work with Culture Club. House of Miracles like their debut studio album, Velocity (1984), failed to chart. "Girl Most Likely To" was the only single released from the album but it also did not chart and the band broke up a year after the album was released. The track "Souvenirs" had been written for the Bangles but that failed to materialise and it was instead recorded for this album.

To date, the album remains unavailable on CD or MP3 and has been long out of print on vinyl since its initial release.

Track listing
Side one
"Danger Zone" – 3:15
"Girl Most Likely To" – 3:42
"Way with Words" – 3:53
"Face to Face" – 3:16
"Hand in Hand" – 3:00

Side two
"House of Miracles" – 3:19
"Souvenirs" – 3:23
"Guardian Angel" – 3:36
"Buried Treasure" – 3:14
"Once Upon a Time" – 3:42

Personnel
Credits are adapted from the House of Miracles liner notes.

The Vels
 Alice Cohen (as Alice Desoto) — vocals; keyboards
 Charles Hansen — drums; bass; guitar; keyboards; percussion

Additional musicians
 Julian Lindsay — Yamaha QXI sequencer programming
 Robert Holmes — guitars on "Girl Most Likely To"

Production
 Steve Levine — producer; mixer
 The Vels — mixing
 Ron Saint Germain — mixing on "Girl Most Likely To"
 Greg Laney — engineer
 Jacques Hermet — assistant engineer

References

1986 albums
The Vels albums
Mercury Records albums
Albums produced by Steve Levine
Synth-pop albums by American artists